The 0-10,000 NABC Pairs or 10K NABC Pairs is held at the Summer American Contract Bridge League (ACBL) North American Bridge Championship (NABC).

The 10K NABC Pairs is a four-session matchpoint pairs event with two qualifying sessions and two final sessions. The event is restricted to players with fewer than 10,000 masterpoints.

History
The inaugural 10K NABC Pairs was held in 2014 at the Summer NABC in Las Vegas, Nevada.

Winners

References

Sources

"ACBL Live" acbl.org. ACBL. Retrieved 1 August 2019.
"NABC Winners"  acbl.org. ACBL. Retrieved 1 August 2019

External links
ACBL official website

North American Bridge Championships